Kuik may refer to:
 Kuik, Kurdistan
 Kuik, West Azerbaijan
 Kuik-e Azizi Amin
 Kuik-e Hasan
 Kuik-e Mahmud
 Kuik-e Majid
 Kuik-e Shekar
 Saipa Kuik

See also
 KUIK